Solana del Pino is a small village in the province of Ciudad Real, Spain, near the  Sierra Madrona and Jaén province borders.

See list of municipalities in Ciudad Real province.

References

Municipalities in the Province of Ciudad Real